Jean Isabel Smith (born 1959) is a Canadian writer, painter and the lead singer of the Vancouver band Mecca Normal.

Career

Music
Smith co-founded Mecca Normal with bandmate David Lester in 1981, while the two were working together at a Vancouver newspaper. Mecca Normal is considered a forerunner of the 1990s politically charged riot grrrl movement.

Painting
In 2000, Smith's series of watercolour self-portraits (1973–1999, from age 13 onward) were exhibited at Olympia's Ladyfest Art Show. The self-portrait series is included in Mecca Normal's music, art and lecture event How Art & Music Can Change the World which, since 2002, Smith and Lester have been presenting in university and high school classrooms, art galleries, indie media outlets and book stores. The lecture was presented on an April 2009 tour marking Mecca Normal's twenty-fifth anniversary after which it evolved into Smith's adaptation of David Lester's graphic novel The Listener (Arbeiter Ring, 2011) which deals with similar themes.

Smith has continued the self-portrait series in watercolour, video and photography, including photos from her online dating profiles in her short film Attraction is Ephemeral — the title of a song on Mecca Normal's 2006 album The Observer.

She began a series of paintings in 2016 to the present that she sells each day via Facebook posts to raise money to create an artist residency in Vancouver.

Writing
In August 1993, Smith's first novel I Can Hear Me Fine was published by David Lester's publishing company Get to the Point. Her second novel, The Ghost of Understanding, was published by Arsenal Pulp Press in 1998. Chapbooks The Family Swan and Other Songs (2002) and Two Stories (2006) were published by Get to the Point.

References

External links

1959 births
Living people
Feminist artists
Feminist musicians
Film directors from Vancouver
Musicians from Vancouver
Writers from Vancouver
Canadian indie rock musicians
Canadian women film directors
Canadian women guitarists
Canadian punk rock guitarists
Canadian punk rock singers
Canadian women singers
Canadian women novelists
Canadian women poets
20th-century Canadian novelists
21st-century Canadian poets
20th-century Canadian women writers
21st-century Canadian women writers
Women punk rock singers